The Accidental Pervert is a universally themed play written and performed by Andrew Goffman and directed by Charles Messina.

Story 

An 11-year-old boy finds his father's collection of X-rated videos hidden in a bedroom closet and subsequently develops an addiction to pornography that continues until the age of 26, when he meets his wife to be, and finds himself struggling to find the balance between fantasy and reality. But it's not all laughs in this coming of age story, which ends on a touching moment of redemption as our beloved main character finds true love and perspective which he compassionately shares with the audience.

In a May 2012 interview with Village Voice columnist Michael Musto, Goffman revealed that he was actually 10 years old when he first discovered his father's pornographic video collection and that, at the age of 15, he had his first sexual experience.

History 

Now in its 7th year running, the play was first performed on November 16, 2005, at the 45th Street Theater in New York City as part of the Double Helix Theatre Company's fifth annual One Festival.  From there, it moved to the Triad Theater, running from February 2 to February 24, 2006. A percentage of the proceeds from these performances were donated to Broadway Cares/Equity Fights Aids.  The play then began a longer run at The Players Theater, also in New York City, from January 23, 2010, until June 25, 2011.

The play moved to its current home, the 13th Street Repertory Company, on  July 15, 2011.

International Premiere 

On August 19, 2010, the play premiered in Argentina, at the ND/Ateneo in Buenos Aires' Cultural Center with Argentinian comedian, TV and radio personality Cabito (Eduardo Javier Cabito Massa Alcántara) in the starring role.

The show's theme has resonated globally and has successfully expanded its reach throughout Europe and Latin America including:

Panama, where it received a nod for Best Theatrical Comedy of 2013. Playing at the 100-seat La Quadra Theatre, the lead role went to renowned actor Aaron Zebede, who appears alongside Benicio del Toro in the film "Escobar: Paradise Lost" and with Robert De Niro and Usher in the upcoming film "Hands of Stone".

Malta, where it ran at the St. James Theater in Valletta, starring Malcolm Galea, with Marc Cabourdin holding the directorial reins.

Switzerland, where the Swiss debut featured actor-comedian Beat Schlatter at the Theater Stok in Zurich.

Upcoming productions will be Norway, playing the 700-seat Kilden Theater in Kristiansand and the prestigious Christiana Theater in Oslo.

Milestones 

The show celebrated its 200th performance on September 10, 2011.

References

External links 
 Official site
 Artist Connection Podcast interview with Andrew Goffman

2005 plays
American plays
Comedy plays
Melodramas